Miloslav Luther (born 14 August 1945) is a Slovak film director and screenwriter. He was a member of the Federal board for broadcasting and retransmission of the Czechoslovak Federative Republic, a member of the Board of Slovak Television, vice-president of the Slovak Film and Television Academy and a pedagogue of directing at the Academy of Performing Arts in Bratislava. He is the head of the board of the Slovak Audiovisual Fund as well as a member of the Slovak Film Institute board.

Selected filmography

 A Step Into the Dark (2014)
 Mosquitos' Tango (2009)
 Escape to Buda (2002)
 Angel of Mercy (1993)
 Try to Embrace Me (1991)
 Witness of the Dying Time (1990)
 A Path Across Danube (1989)
 Bit Part (1988)
 Mahuliena, The Golden Maid (1986)
 Forget Mozart (1985)
 King Blackbird (1984)
 Old Beekeeper (1981)
 A Triptych About Love (1980)
 A Morning Under Moon (1979)

References

External links 
 
 

1945 births
Living people
Slovak film directors